The 2004 W-League Season was the league's 10th. The Vancouver Whitecaps Women won the W-League title, defeating the New Jersey Wildcats 4-2 in Ottawa.

Changes from 2003 season

Name changes
One team changed their name in the off-season:

Expansion teams
Fourteen teams were added for the season:

Teams leaving
Two teams folded after the 2004 season:
 New Jersey Lady Stallions
 Northern Kentucky TC Stars

Standings
Orange indicates bye into W-League semifinals as host.
Blue indicates division title clinched
Green indicates playoff berth clinched

Central Conference

Atlantic Division

Midwest Division

Eastern Conference

New England Division

North Central Division

Northeast Division

Western Conference

Playoffs

Format
Seven teams each from the Eastern Conference, four teams from the Central Conference and two from the Western Conference qualify for the playoffs. The Ottawa Fury Women received a bye into the W-League semifinals as hosts. All matchups are in a one-leg format.

In the Central Conference, the Division champions play the second-place team from the same division, who will play each other to advance to the W-League Semifinals.

In the Eastern Conference, the top two teams in each division play each other, except for the Division champion with the best record, that receives a bye to the Conference Semifinals, and Ottawa, who has a bye to the W-League Semifinals. The team with the worst record in the Conference Semifinals plays the team with the Divisional Finals bye, and the other two teams play each other. The winners play to advance to the W-League Semifinals.

The two teams in the Western Conference will play each other to advance to the W-League Semifinals.

Conference Brackets
Central Conference

Eastern Conference

Western Conference

W-League Championship Bracket

Divisional Round

Conference semifinals

Conference finals

W-League Semifinals

W-League Third Place

W-League Finals

See also
United Soccer Leagues 2004
2004 PDL Season

2004
Women
2004 in American women's soccer
2004 in Canadian women's soccer